Swedish Bandy Hall of Fame was created in 2012 by the Swedish Bandy Association. A number of former bandy players and leaders are inducted every year.

References

Sports halls of fame
Bandy in Sweden
Halls of fame in Sweden
2012 establishments in Sweden
Awards established in 2012
Ice hockey museums and halls of fame